The 2023 Moscow Oblast gubernatorial election will take place on 10 September 2023, on common election day. Incumbent Governor Andrey Vorobyov is eligible to run to a third term in office.

Background
Then–United Russia faction leader in the State Duma Andrey Vorobyov was appointed acting Governor of Moscow Oblast in November 2012, replacing Sergey Shoigu, who was appointed Minister of Defence after serving just 5 months as Governor of the region, adjacent to the federal capital – Moscow. Vorobyov is viewed as Shoigu's confidant, as the governor's father, Yuri Vorobyov, was Shoigu's long–time deputy in the Ministry of Emergency Situations. Vorobyov overwhelmingly won gubernatorial elections in 2013 and 2018 with 78.94% and 62.52% of the vote, respectively.

The upcoming gubernatorial election is unlikely to be competitive, as Andrey Vorobyov has decent ratings and constantly tops in various governance metrics. Statewide elections in Moscow Oblast are also quite difficult for oppositional candidates to compete in due to oblast's size and its dependence on Moscow's expensive economic, transport and media markets.

Candidates
In Moscow Oblast candidates for Governor can be nominated only by registered political parties. Candidate for Governor of Moscow Oblast should be a Russian citizen and at least 30 years old. Candidates for Governor should not have a foreign citizenship or residence permit. Each candidate in order to be registered is required to collect at least 7% of signatures of members and heads of municipalities (196–205 signatures). Also gubernatorial candidates present 3 candidacies to the Federation Council and election winner later appoints one of the presented candidates. In 2021 "On Common Principles of Organisation of Public Authority in the Subjects of the Russian Federation" law was enacted, which lifted term limits for Russian governors, Moscow Oblast amended its legislation to remove term limits in September 2022, allowing Vorobyov to seek a third full term.

Potential
Boris Nadezhdin (New People), Member of Dolgoprudny Council of Deputies (1990–1997, 2019–present), former Member of State Duma (1999–2003), 2018 Party of Growth gubernatorial candidate
Kleopatra Orlova (New People), psychologist, life coach
Andrey Vorobyov (United Russia), incumbent Governor of Moscow Oblast (2012–present)

See also
2023 Russian regional elections

References

Moscow Oblast
Moscow Oblast
Politics of Moscow Oblast